Berghin is a commune located in Alba County, Transylvania, Romania. It has a population of 2,169 and is composed of four villages: Berghin, Ghirbom (Oláhgorbó), Henig (Henningsdorf; Henningfalva) and Straja (Őregyháza).

According to the census from 2011 there was a total population of 1,893 people living in this commune. Of this population, 89.75% are ethnic Romanians, 4.28% ethnic Romani, and 1.27% are ethnic Germans.

The  dates from 1688.

Natives
Zenovie Pâclișanu

References

Communes in Alba County
Localities in Transylvania